Raphael Guimarães de Paula (born 5 September 1994), commonly known as Dodô, is a Brazilian footballer who plays for Khor Fakkan as an attacking midfielder.

Club career
Born in Vespasiano, Minas Gerais, Dodô joined Atlético Mineiro's youth setup in 2005, aged 11. He made his professional – and Série A – debut on 9 October 2013, coming on as a late substitute in a 0–2 away loss against Ponte Preta.

On 8 November 2014 Dodô scored his first professional goal, netting the last of a 2–0 away success over Palmeiras. On 2 December, after scoring three further goals, he renewed his contract until 2019.

Honours
Atlético Mineiro
Copa do Brasil: 2014
Campeonato Mineiro: 2015

Chapecoense
 Campeonato Catarinense: 2017

Fortaleza
Campeonato Brasileiro Série B: 2018

References

External links
Atlético official profile 

1994 births
Living people
Sportspeople from Minas Gerais
Brazilian footballers
Brazilian expatriate footballers
Association football midfielders
Campeonato Brasileiro Série A players
Campeonato Brasileiro Série B players
UAE Pro League players
Clube Atlético Mineiro players
Figueirense FC players
Associação Chapecoense de Futebol players
Botafogo Futebol Clube (SP) players
Fortaleza Esporte Clube players
Khor Fakkan Sports Club players
Footballers at the 2015 Pan American Games
Pan American Games bronze medalists for Brazil
Pan American Games medalists in football
Expatriate footballers in the United Arab Emirates
Brazilian expatriate sportspeople in the United Arab Emirates
Medalists at the 2015 Pan American Games